Jonathan (or Jonathas, Italian Gionata; died July 1121), a member of a cadet branch of the Drengot family, was the Duke of Gaeta from 1113 until his death. He is known from the Codex Caietanus to have been in the fourth year of his minority in 1116 and the seventh of his rule in 1119. There are three theories of his paternity. He may have been the son of Count Jonathan I of Carinola or his grandson by an unnamed son, or else the grandson of Count Bartholomew of Carinola. He was under the regency of his cousin or uncle, Count Richard of Carinola.

After the death of Duke Andrew of Gaeta without heirs in 1113, the duchy escheated to Prince Robert I of Capua, who bestowed it on Jonathan and appointed Richard his regent. As a sign of Gaeta's semi-independence, between March 1113 and July 1114 he and Richard issued charters dated to the joint-reign (1092–1118) of the Byzantine emperors Alexios I and John II. The succession of Jonathan was not without incident. The widow of Duke Richard II tried with her new husband to seize the duchy, but Richard of Carinola succeeded in getting control of it after a short war.

There are no Gaetan follari (copper coins) definitively attributable to the reign of Jonathan. Specimens with the inscriptions IOAN and IOHS DVX may belong to him, but are more usually ascribed to John IV (991–1012).

Notes

Sources

1121 deaths
Italo-Normans
Dukes of Gaeta
12th-century Italian nobility
Year of birth unknown